is a Japanese voice actor who is affiliated with Office Kaoru. He has been voice-acting since the early 2000s.

Personal life
Masashi enjoys swimming. He is a class C swimming instructor in addition to being a voice actor.

Filmography
Major roles are highlighted in bold.

Anime television series
2007
Yattokame Tanteidan - Detective Naoki Saginoya
2014
 Detective Conan - Seiya Kataoka

Anime OVA series
2010
 Detective Conan: Magic File 4 - Osaka Okonomiyaki Odyssey - Student

Anime films
2007
 Summer Days with Coo - Cop

Dubbing Work

Live Action Films
 A Glimpse of Hell - Additional Voices
 Anatomy 2 - Additional Voices
 Cherry Falls - Kenny Ascott (Gabriel Mann) (Home Video Dub)
 Freaky Friday - Additional Voices
 Watch the Shadows Dance - Pete 'Pearly' Gates (Doug Parkinson) (2002 Home Video Dub)

References

External links
 

1977 births
Living people
Male voice actors from Fukui Prefecture
Japanese male voice actors